is a fictional character and the central antagonist of the Kingdom Hearts game franchise by Square Enix. He is the main antagonist of the Dark Seeker Saga, the first phase in the Kingdom Hearts series. He was introduced as the original form of the sentient Heartless "Ansem, Seeker of Darkness" in the first game and the Nobody Xemnas in Kingdom Hearts II. Meanwhile, Kingdom Hearts Birth by Sleep reveals the human elder Xehanort who, like his alter-egos, wishes to create hearts labeled as Kingdom Hearts. While Kingdom Hearts III is the last major installment that focuses on Xehanort, the mobile phone game Dark Road explores the character's childhood and descent into villainy.

Xehanort was created by Kingdom Hearts director and designer, Tetsuya Nomura, who decided to revise elements of him when Square Enix greenlighted Kingdom Hearts II. Critical response to Xehanort was originally mixed as a result of his multiple alter-egos with different names that might confuse the audience. His further exploration in Birth by Sleep and handling of boss battles were the subject of praise.

Creation and development
Xehanort was originally conceptualized as a one-game only villain by Tetsuya Nomura for the video game Kingdom Hearts. However, when Square Enix got the approval to make the sequel Kingdom Hearts II, Nomura put together and decided an outline. He was often told by the manga artist that they felt "the characters come alive however they want," and some parts did change from their original conceptualization. Nomura conceived Xehanort as a character that is studied by the players in each installment of the series. Ansem symbolizes the heart while Xemnas the body leading to the focus of the original Xehanort in the future titles. In retrospect, Nomura believes this was properly explored as each game builds up Xehanort's character until his full introduction.

The biggest change to Xehanort's character in Kingdom Hearts II is how doppelganger, the Heartless Ansem Seeker of Darkness, was revised to feel more like an imposter of the real Ansem the Wise, with more villainous traits. Kingdom Hearts II features another Xehanort doppelganger, the Nobody Xemnas, leader of Organization XIII. The concept of Organization XIII began with Xemnas as the first member and Roxas, Sora's Nobody as the last. Each of the original members' name is an anagram of their original name prior to becoming a Nobody, with the addition of the letter "X" which is revealed in Kingdom Hearts Birth by Sleep to be derived from the χ-blade.

The members are depicted to wear black, hooded coats that shield them from the corrosive effect of prolonged use of the Corridors of Darkness, portals they use to traverse among worlds. Following the release of the Kingdom Hearts II Final Mix, Nomura revealed a connection cameo characters and Xemnas, but wanted to leave it up to people's imagination as he still could not reveal their identities. This was done through the fight sequence between Sora's predecessors against the unnamed elder, later revealed as Master Xehanort, and his apprentice Vanitas.

Nomura explained that Master Xehanort wishes to bring back the Keyblade War and see what happens afterward with his own eyes, but once he finds a way to accomplish this he is an old man with only a few years left to him. Wishing to become young again, he finds Terra, and defeats him with darkness so he can take his body. That is the Xehanort that Ansem the Wise picks up, and makes his number one apprentice. In response to rumors saying that Sora's story would end in Kingdom Hearts III, Nomura answered that Sora is the protagonist of the series and that instead Xehanort's arc would end in such a title. In retrospect, Nomura said it was difficult to enjoy Sora's side of the story and instead like Xehanort's character when making the narrative.

Casting

Billy Zane voiced Ansem in the first game. He was replaced by Richard Epcar for the later titles. Reflecting on his work, Epcar enjoyed his works in the Kingdom Hearts franchise due to all the people he met. Xemnas was voiced by Norio Wakamoto in Japanese and Paul St. Peter in English. Peter felt that the quick audition led to a positive response from the staff. He came to enjoy voicing Xemnas alongside Wormmon from Digimon Adventure 02. He found the role challenging as he had to work as carefully as Wakamoto.

For the eventual release of Birth by Sleep, Ryōtarō Okiayu was chosen as Terra's Japanese voice as the staff wanted an actor who sounded similar to Chikao Ōtsuka, Xehanort's original voice, and Akio Ōtsuka, Xehanort's later voice who also voiced the villain while using Terra's body. The staff found Chikao's to be a dry sort of voice, and Akio's a deep, resonating sort of voice, and liked how Okiayu bore elements from both actors. This eventually led to the possession of Terra's body in the prequel by Xehanort and how they would become the villains from the main games. Nomura claims a hidden message in Xehanort's last lines when he hints that somebody else is in Terra's heart. Chikao Ōtsuka died during the development of Kingdom Hears III. While Square was compiling Ansem's voice, in the same scene they could hear Master Xehanort's line. At the time, no substitute voice actor had been chosen, so the staff thought that maybe some line they had recorded previously was playing, but it turned out that Akio Otsuka, the voice actor for Ansem that took Xehanort's identity, was playing the part. The staff, surprised by how uncomfortable they felt, decided to ask him to play the role. Master Xehanort was voiced in English by Leonard Nimoy in Birth by Sleep and Dream Drop Distance. Following Nimoy's death in 2015, Rutger Hauer assumed the role in Kingdom Hearts III, later to be replaced by Christopher Lloyd in the Re:Mind DLC and Melody of Memory following Hauer's own passing.

Meanwhile, the youthful Xehanort was voiced by Takanori Okuda and Benjamin Diskin. Diskin commented he had to manage his pitch to sound as young as Okuda. As a result, Diskin was afraid about his performance due to how the early trailers of Kingdom Hearts III could be received. Diskin had played the numbered titles of the franchise and thus had little knowledge about his character since Xehanort's identity was primarily explored in the non-numbered games. Throughout the recording of Kingdom Hearts 3D, no one told him what his character was going through, or what his motivations were. As a result, the actor had little understanding of the narrative.

Appearances
Xehanort is re-established as an elderly Keyblade Master from the Destiny Islands who acquired the means to transplant a piece of his heart into the bodies of others, which he uses to orchestrate the events through Kingdom Hearts III to suit his agenda. Throughout the series, Xehanort is driven by an obsessive interest in the Keyblade War, a historic cataclysm that produced the universe's present, fragmented state. In Kingdom Hearts Birth by Sleep, he attempts to use the hearts of his pupils Ventus and Vanitas to forge the χ-blade and unlock Kingdom Hearts to incite another war. He wanted to create a new world where light and darkness exist in perfect balance. He transfers his heart into Terra's body, prolonging his own life. He is defeated through the combined efforts of Ventus, Terra, and Aqua, incurring amnesia in the process. In Kingdom Hearts 3D: Dream Drop Distance, Xehanort returns to his original form following the destruction of Ansem and Xemnas, who are revealed to have been created to re-enact his original plan by gathering seven "guardians of light" and thirteen "seekers of darkness" in the form of the Princesses of Heart and Organization XIII, respectively. He uses time travel to assemble Ansem, Xemnas, and other versions of himself from across time into a new Organization, sending their hearts into replica bodies to co-exist with their present selves. In Kingdom Hearts III, where he is defeated and his past selves are eliminated during a showdown against Sora's group, Xehanort surrenders and allows his heart to pass on together with his former friend Eraqus. In Kingdom Hearts χ, he is revealed to be the descendant of Ephemer.

, Xehanort's Heartless and the main antagonist of the first Kingdom Hearts and Riku's story in Kingdom Hearts: Chain of Memories. He uses Maleficent to gather the Princesses of Heart and produce the Keyhole to Kingdom Hearts, later possessing Riku's body to regain his human appearance; as revealed in Dream Drop Distance, his incorporeal form allows him to travel to the past to initiate Xehanort's teenage self. Following Ansem's destruction, his presence continues to linger within Riku's heart in Chain of Memories until it is destroyed by Ansem the Wise's malfunctioning heart encoder in Kingdom Hearts II. 
Xemnas, Xehanort's Nobody and the main antagonist of Kingdom Hearts II and Kingdom Hearts 358/2 Days. He is the founder and "superior" of the first Organization XIII, whom he manipulates into constructing artificial Kingdom Hearts to turn them into vessels for Xehanort's heart, as revealed in Dream Drop Distance. His name is an anagram of "Ansem" with an additional letter "X". 
Terra-Xehanort, the original form of Ansem and Xemnas who was first seen as Ansem the Wise's amnesiac apprentice. Despite being an amnesiac, he steals his mentor's identity while conducting his experiments involving Heartless and Nobodies. In Kingdom Hearts III, Terra's heart takes control of the Dark Figure and returns to its body with Sora's help, expelling Xehanort's heart.
Young Xehanort, Xehanort's adolescent self and the main antagonist of Dream Drop Distance, whom the Heartless Ansem summons from the past to assemble the "real" Organization XIII from his other incarnations and a certain member of the previous Organization. Though he loses his memories upon returning to his time, he remains motivated by the destiny "etched in [his] heart" to carry out all of his future self's plans.

Reception

USGamer praised  Xehanort's debut in the series for giving the narrative a major impact as he takes over the role of the Disney villains, and corrupts and possesses Riku's body. The scene is noted to expand the series' lore little by little not only through Riku's actions but also because it explores the ruined Hollow Bastion, which is a former lively place now ruled by Xehanort.GamesRadar enjoyed the final boss fight from the game. The site noted Ansem still manages to further corrupt Riku, labeling his resulting personality who is unwilling to reunite with Sora. Xemnas' handling in Kingdom Hearts II was called predictable. This led to more criticism as Ansem's and Xemnas' destructions lead to the return of the original Xehanort, rendering the heroes' action meaningless. 

Comic Book Resources enjoyed Riku's handling of Ansem's powers as he manages to use them to overcome his inner darkness in both Chain of Memories and Dream Drop Distance. The same was said with how Riku once again used Ansem's power for justice in Kingdom Hearts II and 358/2 Days to defeat Roxas and help in Sora's awakening in the former game as Roxas was needed to awake the comatose teenager. The site listed Sora's and Riku's fight against Xemnas's as one of Riku's best action sequences.

In the book Kingdom Hearts II (Boss Fight Books Book 16), Alexa Ray Corriea describes Ansem as a mad scientist whose multiple personalities would confuse the audience. Xemnas' early characterization was described as the "gray area" from the series since during Kingdom Hearts II the character and his group were not related to darkness or light.

The elder Master Xehanort from Birth by Sleep was the subject of commentary eliciting parallels given to Emperor Palpatine from Star Wars. Bob Miur from Destructoid compared Terra's storyline with Star Wars: Episode III – Revenge of the Sith and how he was the corrupted Anakin Skywalker manipulated by Xehanot in a similar fashion to Palpatine. Comic Book Resources noted similarities between Xehanort and Palpatine due to how the villain corrupts the young hero so that both lose possession of their original selves when the villain succeeds in obtaining their desires. 

CinemaBlend praised how the prequel explores Xehanort's character while highlighting how he nearly succeeds in defeating all the protagonists from the game. Comic Book Resources noted that several of Xehanort's actions contribute to the heroes' downfall.. Another aspect of Birth by Sleep touched by website 3DJuegos was the relationship between Xehanort and Eraqus.

For Xehanort's role in Dream Drop Distance, RPGSite lamented how Disney villains were overshadowed by him while GameInformer saw it as a prologue to Kingdom Hearts III. While Kingdom Hearts III focuses on Xehanort's return, Polygon commented players should play or watch cutscenes from other games to understand more of his actions. By Kingdom Hearts III, Comic Book Resources noted that Xehanort causes the biggest catastrophes in the series, citing Kairi's death and the usage of Organization XIII for his own personal needs. The same site listed his alter egos as the sixth most challenging boss ever in the game while his true persona ranked second behind Yozora. 

GameSpot enjoyed how the Remind DLC re-explores more of Xenahort's character from Kingdom Hearts III. GameSpot in retrospect found Xehanort's identity confusing due to the several alter egos he created in the franchise. Meristation referred to the character in general, complex and manipulative while the same time redeeming in his final moments, he accepts his defeat to Sora and gives him the X-Blade, to the youth as he moves to the afterlife with Eraqus.

Zane's work as Xehanort (Ansem), was noted by Kotaku in an article involving "cheesy video game voice acting" as the writer claimed "Zane's performance is a combination of rocky growlings and deep bass utterances" as a result of how many taunts he makes during the cutscenes, making the villain stand out.  CinemaBlend enjoyed Nimoy's performance. GameSpot labeled Nimoy as having one of the best performances in Birth by Sleep. Hauer's portrayal was praised by Meristation who noted that Xehanort was one of the actor's final works before his death, but HardcoreGamer felt he did not match Nimoy's performance. Nevertheless, the works of Richard Epcar and Paul St. Peter as Xehanort's alter egos were well received by the site. Christopher Lloyd's performance in the DLC was praised by The Gamer as they believe he fit the character.

References

Fictional characters with amnesia
Fictional characters with earth or stone abilities
Fictional characters who can manipulate darkness or shadows
Fictional explorers in video games
Fictional hypnotists and indoctrinators
Fictional kidnappers
Fictional knights in video games
Kingdom Hearts original characters
Mad scientist characters in video games
Time travelers
Video game bosses
Video game characters who can teleport
Video game characters with ice or cold abilities
Video game characters introduced in 2002

ja:キングダム ハーツの登場キャラクター#その他の敵役達